White is the soundtrack to the film Three Colors: White by Polish composer Zbigniew Preisner and performed by Silesian Philharmonic choir along with Sinfonia.

Track listing 
 The Beginning
 The Court
 Dominique Tries To Go Home
 A Chat In The Underground
 Return To Poland
 Home At Last
 On The Wisla
 First Job
 Don't Fall Asleep
 After The First Transaction
 Attempted Murder
 The Party On The Wisla
 Don Karol I
 Phone Call To Dominique
 Funeral Music
 Don Karol II
 Morning At The Hotel
 Dominique's arrest
 Don Karol III
 Dominique In Prison
 The End

Three Colors soundtracks 
 Three Colors: Blue (soundtrack)
 Three Colors: White (soundtrack)
 Three Colors: Red (soundtrack)

References

External links 
 White - Original Motion Picture Soundtrack

1994 soundtrack albums
Comedy film soundtracks
Drama film soundtracks